Sessions is This Condition's fourth EP, a seven-track album recorded in over 2012-2013.  Written by the band in a session with Ace Enders, it was recorded over three different sessions. It was released on April 23, 2013 through online retailers and digital music stores (iTunes).  The album includes new recorded piano versions of 'Take, Take, Take' and 'Lost'.

Track listing

Personnel

Band members
Nathan Cyphert – Vocals, Acoustic Guitar
Mike McGovern - Guitar, Mandolin
Nick Cantatore – Bass
Devin Passariello – Drums
Stephen Conley - Guitar, Backing Vocals
Chris Castellino - Keyboard, Backing Vocals

Production
Tracks 1-2 Recorded, Mixed and Mastered by John Naclerio at Nada Studios
Tracks 3-5 Recorded and Mixed by Nick Zinnanti at Zin Studios and Mastered by John Naclerio at Nada Studios
Tracks 6-7 Recorded and Mixed by Tim Segado at Hofstra University and Mastered by Stephen Conley

All songs written by This Condition except “Die” and “You Don’t”, written by This Condition and Ace Enders

References

External links
Official This Condition Website

2013 EPs
This Condition albums